The executions during the Irish Civil War took place during the guerrilla phase of the Irish Civil War (June 1922 – May 1923). This phase of the war was bitter, and both sides, the government forces of the Irish Free State and the anti-Treaty Irish Republican Army (IRA) insurgents, used executions and terror in what developed into a cycle of atrocities. From November 1922, the Free State government embarked on a policy of executing Republican prisoners in order to bring the war to an end. Many of those killed had previously been allies, and in some cases close friends (during the Irish War of Independence 1919–1921), of those who ordered their deaths in the civil war. In addition, government troops summarily executed prisoners in the field on several occasions. The executions of prisoners left a lasting legacy of bitterness in Irish politics.

The use of execution by the Irish Free State in the Civil War was relatively harsh compared to the recent British record. In contrast with 81 official executions by the Irish Free State government, the British had executed 24 IRA volunteers during the 1919–21 conflict.

Background
Michael Collins, commander of the Free State Provisional Government's National Army, had hoped for a speedy reconciliation of the warring Irish nationalist factions, demanding that Republicans must accept the people's verdict and then could go home without their arms stating that "We want to avoid any possible unnecessary destruction and loss of life. We do not want to mitigate their weakness by resolute action beyond what is required".

However, following the death of Collins in an ambush on 22 August 1922, the Free State provisional government, under the new leadership of W. T. Cosgrave, Richard Mulcahy and Kevin O'Higgins, took the position that the Anti-Treaty IRA were conducting an unlawful rebellion against the legitimate Irish government and should be treated as criminals rather than as combatants. O'Higgins in particular voiced the opinion that the use of martial law was the only way to bring the war to an end.

Another factor contributing to the executions policy was the escalating level of violence. In the first two months of the Civil War (July–August 1922), Free State forces had successfully taken all the territory held by Republicans and the war seemed all but over. After the Anti-Treaty side moved to guerrilla tactics in August–September, National Army casualties mounted and they even lost control over some of the territory taken in the Irish Free State offensive. The town of Kenmare, for example, was re-taken by Anti-Treaty fighters on 9 September and held by them until early December.

Legal basis for the executions
On 27 September 1922, three months after the outbreak of war, the Free State's Provisional Government put before the Dáil the Army Emergency Powers Resolution, proposing legislation to try suspects by military court martial. This had the effect of instituting martial law for the duration of the conflict. The legislation, commonly referred to as the Public Safety Bill, empowered military tribunals with the ability to impose penal servitude of any duration, as well as the death penalty, for a variety of offences including, for 'aiding or abetting attacks' on state forces, possession of arms and ammunition or explosive 'without the proper authority' and 'looting, destruction of public or private property or arson'.

By imposing capital punishment for anyone found in possession of either firearms or ammunition, without a lawful reason, the Free State could punish Republican sympathisers for storing any arms or ammunition that could be used by Republican forces.

A motion was put to the Dáil by the Minister for Defence Richard Mulcahy on 26 September to amend the army's Emergency Powers Order; it stated:
"(IV.) The breach of any general order or regulation made by the Army authorities; and the infliction by such Military Courts or Committees of the punishment of death, or of imprisonment for any period, or of a fine of any amount either with or without imprisonment, on any person found guilty by any such Court or Committee of any of the offences aforesaid;"

This motion was amended and approved by resolution of the Dáil, after considerable debate. The Republican, or Anti-Treaty, members had refused to take their seats in the Parliament and the opposition to the measures was provided by the Labour Party, who likened the legislation to a military dictatorship. On 3 October, the Free State had offered an amnesty to any Anti-Treaty fighters who surrendered their arms and recognised the government. However, there was little response. W. T. Cosgrave, the head of the Provisional Government, told the Dáil in response, "Although I have always objected to the death penalty, there is no other way that I know of in which ordered conditions can be restored in this country, or any security obtained for our troops, or to give our troops any confidence in us as a government".

The final version, passed on 18 October 1922, stated:

"(4) The breach of any general order or regulation made by the Army Council and the infliction by such Military Courts or Committees of the punishment of death or of penal servitude for any period or of imprisonment for any period or of a fine of any amount either with or without imprisonment on any person found guilty by such Court or Committee of any of the offences aforesaid. Provided that no such sentence of death be executed except under the countersignature of two members of the Army Council".

The Order was strengthened in January 1923 to allow execution for many other categories of offence, including non-combatant Republican supporters carrying messages, assisting in escapes or using army or police uniforms; and also desertion from the National Army.

After the Civil War the government also felt the need to pass the Indemnity Act, 1923, which stipulated that all sentences passed on military prisoners taken by the Provisional Government's forces, before the passing of the Act, were retrospectively "valid". Two Public Safety Acts were also passed in 1923.

Other social pressures
Soon after the passage of the resolution, several other pressures were brought to bear on Republican fighters.

On 10 October, the Catholic Hierarchy issued a pastoral letter condemning the Anti-Treaty fighters, ending with: "All who in contravention of this teaching, participate in such crimes are guilty of grievous sins and may not be absolved in Confession nor admitted to the Holy Communion if they persist in such evil courses." In effect this meant that the Anti-Treaty fighters would be excommunicated, and if killed could not expect a church burial or to pass on to heaven. In a population that was overwhelmingly Catholic and very devout, this was an extremely powerful social pressure applied at an opportune time for the Provisional Government.

On 15 October, directives were sent to the press by Free State director of communications, Piaras Béaslaí to the effect that Free State troops were to be referred to as the "National Army", the "Irish Army", or just "troops". The Anti-Treaty side were to be called "Irregulars" and were not to be referred to as "Republicans", "IRA", "forces", or "troops", nor were the ranks of their officers allowed to be given.

From now on, the Free State, equipped with updated military courts legislation, the support of the Church and of much of the Press, was prepared to treat the Republican fighters as criminals rather than as combatants.

The first executions and reprisals
The first four executions occurred a month after most Republicans had rejected the amnesty that expired in mid-October 1922. On 17 November, four Anti-Treaty IRA fighters were shot in Dublin. They were followed by three more on 19 November.

The next to be executed was Erskine Childers, who had been secretary to the Anglo-Irish Treaty negotiations. Childers was a well-known Republican - it was on his boat, the Asgard, that the guns had been brought in during the Howth gun-running - he was a renowned columnist, novelist, and a member of the Anglo-Irish, Protestant landowning family of Glendalough House, Annamoe, County Wicklow. He had been captured on 10 November in possession of a Spanish-made .32-calibre pocket pistol which Collins had given to him. - or as Charles Gavan Duffy described the circumstances to the Dáil four days after Childers was shot, "The military authorities apparently ascertained that Erskine Childers was living at the home of his childhood in Wicklow; they surrounded the house in the early morning; they found him there and arrested him, as I understand, getting out of bed with a revolver." Childers and eight others appealed to the civilian judiciary. Judge O'Connor, the Master of the Rolls in Ireland, considered whether a state of war existed. He considered the existence of a Provisional Government in Ireland and its authority to act as proposed and execute the nine.

'The Provisional Government now is, de jure as well as de facto, the ruling authority in Ireland and its duty is to preserve the peace, administer the law, and to repress, by force if necessary, all attempts to overthrow it.' 
On 24 November Childers was executed by firing squad. Childers was the Republican head of propaganda and it was widely speculated that seven low-ranking Republicans were shot before Childers so that it would not look as if he had been singled out to be executed.

In response to the executions, on 30 November, Liam Lynch, Chief of Staff of the Anti-Treaty IRA, ordered that any member of Parliament (TD) or senator who had signed or voted for the "murder bill" should be shot on sight. He also ordered the killing of hostile judges and newspaper editors. On the same day, three more Republican prisoners were executed in Dublin.

On 7 December, Anti-Treaty IRA gunmen shot two TDs, Sean Hales and Pádraic Ó Máille, in Dublin as they were on their way to the Dáil. Hales was killed and Ó Máille was badly wounded. After an emergency cabinet meeting, the Free State government decided on the retaliatory executions of four prominent Republicans. Accordingly, on 8 December 1922, the day after Hales' killing, four members of the IRA Army Executive, who had been in jail since the first week of the war – Rory O'Connor, Liam Mellows, Richard Barrett (a close friend of Sean Hales) and Joe McKelvey – were executed in revenge. O'Connor and Mellows particularly were revered heroes of the War of Independence. This was arguably an unlawful act, as the four Republicans had been captured before the Dáil passed the legislation authorising executions. It was also one of the most important Catholic feasts in the calendar, the Feast of the Immaculate Conception. Outside masses that morning, all over the country, leaflets were distributed with a poem by Pádraig de Brún" Rory and Liam and Dick and Joe / (Star of the Morning, Mary, come!) / Red is their hearts' blood, their souls like snow / (Mary Immaculate, guide them home!) / Their eyes are steady in face of death… 
Later on the same day the Dáil debated the executions and retrospectively approved them by a vote of 39-14. One of the poignant aspects of the incident was that O'Connor and Kevin O'Higgins were formerly close friends, and O'Connor had been best man at O'Higgins' wedding just a few months previously. Historian Michael Hopkinson reports that Richard Mulcahy had pressed for the executions and that Kevin O'Higgins was the last member of cabinet to give his consent.
Today, the executions are seen as unconstitutional even by the Fine Gael party, the inheritors of the Free State.

Sean Hales was the only TD to be killed in the war. However, Republicans continued to burn the homes of elected representatives in reprisal for executions of their men. On 10 December, the house of TD Seán McGarry was burned down, killing his seven-year-old son whom the attackers had not realised was inside. Homes of senators were among the 199 houses burned or destroyed by the IRA in the war. In February 1923, Kevin O'Higgins' elderly father was killed by Republicans at the family home in Stradbally, having attempted to snatch a gun from the leader of the group evicting him and his family. The house of the President of the Executive Council W. T. Cosgrave was burned. His uncle was killed during an armed raid on his shop, which does not appear to have been political.

Official executions
In all, the Free State formally sanctioned the execution of 81 Anti-Treaty fighters during the war. Republican historian Dorothy Macardle popularised the number of 77 executions in Republican consciousness, but she appears to have left out those executed for activities such as armed robbery. Those executed were tried by court-martial in a military court and had to be found guilty merely of bearing arms against the State.

 On the 30th of November 1922 there were further executions at Beggars Bush Barracks. Among them was John (Jack) Leo Murphy of 56 Belview Buildings, Dublin, he was a member of "A" Coy, 3rd Batt, Sth Dublin Brigade, IRA. He was 19 years of age. 
After the initial round of executions, the firing squads got under way again in earnest in late December 1922. On 19 December, seven IRA men from Kildare were shot in the Curragh Camp, Co. Kildare. and ten days later, two more were shot in Kilkenny. Most of those executed were prisoners held in Kilmainham and Mountjoy Gaols in Dublin, but from January 1923, Kevin O'Higgins argued that executions should be carried out in every county in order to maximise their impact. Accordingly, in that month, 34 prisoners were shot in such places as Dundalk, Roscrea, Carlow, Birr and Portlaoise, Limerick, Tralee, Roscrea and Athlone. From 8–18 February, the Free State suspended executions and offered an amnesty in the hope that Anti-Treaty fighters would surrender. However, the war dragged on for another two months and witnessed at least 20 more official executions, amongst them six men executed on 11 April in Tuam Military Barracks found guilty of the unlawful possession of arms on 21 February. There is a commemorative plaque in Tuam on the site of the old Military Barracks.

Several Republican leaders narrowly avoided execution. Ernie O'Malley, captured on 4 November 1922, was not executed because he was too badly wounded when taken prisoner to face a court martial and possibly because the Free State was hesitant about executing an undisputed hero of the recent struggle against the British. Liam Deasy, captured in January 1923, avoided execution by signing a surrender document calling on the Anti-Treaty forces to lay down their arms.

The Anti-Treaty side called a ceasefire on 30 April 1923 and ordered their men to "dump arms", ending the war, on 24 May. Nevertheless, executions of Republican prisoners continued after this time. Four IRA men were executed in May after the ceasefire order and the final two executions took place on 20 November, months after the end of hostilities. It was not until November 1924 that a general amnesty was offered for any acts committed in the civil war.

Unofficial killings
In addition to the judicial executions, Free State troops conducted many extrajudicial killings of captured anti-Treaty fighters. From an early point in the war, from late August 1922 (coinciding with the onset of guerrilla warfare), there were many incidents of National Army troops killing prisoners.

In Dublin, a number of people were killed by the new (police) Intelligence service, the Criminal Investigation Department (CID), which was headed by Joseph McGrath and was based in Oriel House in Dublin city centre. (This was separate from the Garda Síochána, the ordinary Irish police force. By 9 September, a British intelligence report stated that "Oriel House" had already killed "a number of Republicans" in Dublin, including Joseph Bergin, a Military Policeman from the Curragh Camp who was believed to have been passing information to Republican prisoners. In a number of cases, Anti-Treaty IRA men and boys were abducted by Free State forces, killed and their bodies dumped in public places; Republican sources detail at least 25 such cases in the Dublin area. There were also allegations of abuse of prisoners during interrogation by the CID. For example, Republican Tom Derrig had an eye shot out while in custody.

County Kerry, where the guerrilla campaign was most intense, would see many of the most vicious episodes in the Civil War. On 27 August, in the first such incident of its type, two anti-treaty fighters were shot after they had surrendered in Tralee, County Kerry. One of them, James Healy, was left for dead but survived to tell of the incident. Republicans also killed prisoners. After their successful attack on Kenmare on 9 September, the Anti-Treaty IRA separated National Army officer Tom "Scarteen" O'Connor and his brother from the 120 other prisoners and shot them dead. There was a steady stream of similar incidents after this point in Kerry, culminating in a series of high-profile atrocities in the month of March 1923.

Also in September, a party of nine Anti-Treaty fighters was wiped out near Sligo by Free State troops. Four of them, (including Brian MacNeill, the son of Eoin MacNeill) were later found to have been shot at close range in the forehead, indicating that they had been shot after surrendering.

The Ballyseedy massacre and its aftermath 
March 1923 saw a series of notorious incidents in Kerry, where 23 Republican prisoners were killed in the field (and another five judicially executed) in a period of just four weeks.

Five Free State soldiers were killed by a booby trap bomb, and another seriously injured, while searching a Republican dugout at the village of Knocknagoshel, County Kerry, on 6 March 1923. Three of those killed were natives of Co Kerry, and the two others were members of the Dublin Guard. This constituted the largest loss of life in a single event for the Free State forces since the Battle of Dublin at the start of the civil war in June 1922. The next day, the local Free State commander in Kerry authorised the use of Republican prisoners to "clear mined roads". Irish Free State Army General Officer Commanding (G.O.C) of the Kerry Division, Major General Paddy Daly justified the measure as "the only alternative left to us to prevent the wholesale slaughter of our men".

That night, 6/7 March, nine Republican prisoners who had previously been tortured, with bones broken with hammers, were taken from Ballymullen Barracks in Tralee to Ballyseedy crossroads and tied to a land mine which was detonated, after which the survivors were machine-gunned. One of the prisoners, Stephen Fuller, was blown to safety by the blast of the explosion. He was taken in at the nearby home of Michael and Hannah Curran. They cared for him and although he was badly injured, he survived - Fuller later became a Fianna Fáil TD. The Free State troops in nearby Tralee had prepared nine coffins, unaware of Fuller's escape, and the Dublin Guard released nine names to the press, the fabrication hastily changed when they realised their mistake. There was a riot when the bodies were brought back to Tralee, where the enraged relatives of the killed prisoners broke open the coffins in an effort to identify their dead.

This was followed by a series of similar incidents with mines within 24 hours of the Ballyseedy killings. Five Republican prisoners were blown up with another landmine at Countess Bridge near Killarney and four in the same manner at Bahaghs near Cahersiveen. Another Republican prisoner, Seamus Taylor, was taken to Ballyseedy woods by National Army troops and shot dead.

On 28 March, five IRA men, captured in an attack on Cahersiveen on 5 March, were officially executed in Tralee. Another, captured the same day, was summarily shot and killed. Thirty-two Anti-Treaty fighters died in Kerry in March 1923, of whom only five were killed in combat. Free State officer Lieutenant Niall Harrington has suggested that reprisal killings of Republican prisoners continued in Kerry up to the end of the war. Harrington had a successful and respected career in the Irish military, retiring as a Lt Colonel in January 1959, after seven years as Deputy Director of G2 (Intelligence) Branch, GHQ, the forerunner to the Directorate of Military Intelligence of the Irish Defence Forces. 

The National Army's Dublin Guard and in particular their commander, Major-General Paddy Daly, were widely held to be responsible for these killings. They claimed that the prisoners had been killed while clearing roads of landmines laid by Republicans. When questioned in the Dáil by Labour Party leader Thomas Johnson, Richard Mulcahy, the National Army's commander-in-chief, supported Daly's story. A military Court of Inquiry conducted in April 1923 - chaired by the chief suspect Daly himself - cleared the Free State troops of the charge of killing their prisoners. Harrington related his concerns to Kevin O'Higgins, a family friend. O'Higgins spoke to Mulcahy in turn who didn't act on the information. Johnson asked O'Higgins in the Dáil about a possible inquest and the latter said it was not impossible, intimating it might not be desirable. 

It has since emerged that the prisoners were beaten, tied to explosives, and then killed. Before leaving Ballymullen barracks in Tralee, Free State officers took some of the nine Republican prisoners into a room as showed them the coffins which had been prepared for them, according to author, historian and researcher Owen O’Shea, in a podcast by the Irish Times published to mark the 100th anniversary of the massacre on 6 March 2023.  The prisoners were tied in a circle around the mine, before it was detonated. Such was the force of the blast, many of the bodies of the victims were dismembered. Dorothy Macardle in her 1924 book Tragedies of Kerry, cited both eye witness accounts and local newspaper reports of the horrific scene of the massacre after it took place.  Witnesses claimed that for weeks after the massacre birds could be seen feeding on lumps of human flesh in trees around the site.  

Owen O'Shea stated that, such was the cruelty and sadistic "lust for revenge" that Paddy Daly had, that after the massacre, the remains of those killed were badly treated by Free State forces. No care was taken to ensure that remains from different victims were not placed together in the same coffin, or indeed to ensure families received the correct remains. When the families of the dead came to the main gates of Ballymullen Barracks on 8 March to collects the remains of their relatives, Daly ordered the unit of the Free State army band based at the barracks, to be stationed at the gate and to play "upbeat jazz music" as a way of taunting the families.

Cahersiveen killings 
Republican prisoners were also being held at the old Irish Poor Law Union workhouse, in the townland of Bahaghs near Cahersiveen, in south Co Kerry. On Monday 12 March 1923, the five Republican prisoners were taken from the workhouse by members of the 'visiting committee' and killed with a mine in the same manner at those at Ballyseedy and Countess Bridge the previous week. These prisoners were reportedly shot in the legs before being blown up to prevent their escape. Lt Harrington and fellow Free-State Lieutenant W McCarthy (who resigned over the incidents) later stated that not only were the explosives detonated by the Free State troops, they had also been made by Free State troops at Ballymullen in Tralee and laid there for this purpose.  

Documents released by the Irish Department of Justice through the National Archives in 2008 show that the Free State Cabinet was aware that the Army's version of events was untrue. An investigation concluded that the prisoners had been killed by a party of National Army soldiers from Dublin known as the 'visiting committee' and that those at Cahersiveen had been beaten and shot before being blown up. 

The records show that the victims of the killings in Bahaghs were Michael Courtney jnr, Eugene Dwyer, Daniel Shea, John Sugrue and William Riordan. All from the Waterville area and were members of a unit in the Kerry No 3 Brigade of the IRA. Maurice Riordan, the father of William Riordan (who was only 18 at the time of his killing) applied to the Compensation (Personal Injuries) Committee - set up to adjudicate on claims arising from the War of Independence and its aftermath - for compensation for this son's death. Several of the families of the other men killed also applied. As a result the Garda Síochána (then called the Civic Guard) undertook an investigation into the Bahaghs killings and concluded the evidence supported the conclusion the men with unlawfully shot and deliberately killed with a mine, and that the National Army version of event was a cover up.  The records show that on 10 December 1923 the then deputy commissioner of the Garda Síochána, Eamonn Coogan (father of the prominent journalist and historian Tim Pat Coogan), included a letter with the Garda report on the Cahersiveen killings to the Secretary of the Department of Justice (then called the Ministry of Justice). In this letter, deputy Commissioner Coogan states that he has been- "directed by the commissioner [Eoin O'Duffy] to inform you that the facts stated are true and are as follow:" [...] William Riordan was an "irregular and one of a column captured with arms". He was temporarily imprisoned at the workhouse, Cahirciveen, he was taken from there and "done to death" with four other prisoners. The body known as the Visiting Committee under Comdt Delaney arrived at Cahirciveen "to carry out an inspection", with Lieut P Kavanagh as second in command. "In the small hours of the morning of March 12th, Kavanagh took five prisoners (of whom Riordan was one) from the guard at the workhouse, remarking 'Would you like to come for a drive?' "The guard, believing the prisoners were being transferred to Tralee, handed them over. It transpired that the five prisoners were subsequently shot and their bodies blown up by a mine at Bahaghs, Cahirsiveen. Evidence of these facts can be procured. "The applicant in the claim, who is the father of William Riordan, is in needy circumstances."

Killings in Wexford and Donegal 
Two other episodes of revenge killing took place elsewhere in the country in the same month. On 13 March, three Republican fighters were judicially executed in Wexford in the southeast. In revenge, three National Army soldiers were captured and killed. 

On 14 March at Drumboe Castle in County Donegal in the northwest of Ireland, four Anti-Treaty IRA fighters, Charlie Daly (26), Sean Larkin (26), Daniel Enright (23), and Timothy O'Sullivan (23), who had been captured and held in the castle since January, were summarily shot in retaliation for the death of a National Army soldier in an ambush.

Free State response 
Despite support from the Department of Justice for  payment of compensation to the family of William Riordan who was killed at Cahersiveen, in April 1924 the Free State Cabinet under WT Cosgrave rejected the claim, and those made by the families of other Republican prisoners unlawfully killed. This, in effect, put an end to any further official investigations of the killings.     

What exactly prompted this outbreak of vindictive killings in Kerry in March 1923 is unclear, but the events that followed in the county would prove to be the most bloody, sadistic and vengeful of the entire civil war.  A total of 68 Free State soldiers had been killed and 157 wounded in Kerry up to March 1923. A total of 85 would die in Kerry before the war was over in May 1923. Why the deaths at Knocknagoshel prompted such a savage response remains an open question. 

But historian Owen O'Shea stated that the "visceral hatred and almost psychopathic approach" of some Free State commanders, such as the Commander of Free State forces in Co Kerry, Major General Paddy Daly, played a role in creating a permissive environment where such acts of cruelty and extra-judicial murder could occur with impunity. This attitude was compounded by the protection offered by senior Army command and the Free State government, up to and including the Minister of Defence and Army Chief of Staff, General Richard Mulcahy, who publicly claimed that Free State forces under his command would never be capable of committing such atrocities. 

A month after the massacre at Ballyseedy a Free State Army Court of Inquiry was held at Tralee on 7 April 1923. It was presided over by Major-General Paddy Daly, and included Major-General Eamon Price, G.H.Q., Portobello Barracks, Dublin and Colonel J. McGuinness, Kerry Command, "for the purpose of inquiring into the circumstances of the death of eight prisoners at Ballyseedy Bridge, near Tralee, on the morning of the 8th March 1923." Unsurprisingly, the inquiry cleared all of the Free State officers and men of any wrongdoing and laid the blamed for the deaths on the actions of Anti-Treaty Republicans laying the mine. General Mulcahy even went so far as to read the findings of the inquiry, now discredited as a whitewash, into the record of Dáil Eireann.

The end of the war
According to historian Tom Mahon, the Irish Civil War, "effectively ended," on 10 April 1923, when the Free State Army mortally wounded IRA Chief of Staff Liam Lynch during a skirmish in County Tipperary. Twenty days later, Lynch's successor, Frank Aiken, gave the order to "dump arms".

Even after the war was over, National Army troops killed anti-Treaty fighters. For example, Noel Lemass, a captain in the anti-Treaty IRA, was abducted in Dublin and summarily executed in July 1923, two months after the war had ended. His body was dumped, probably first in the River Liffey at Manor Kilbride, then moved to Killakee in the Dublin Mountains, near Glencree, where it was found in October 1923. The spot where his body was found is marked by a memorial erected by his brother Seán Lemass - a future Taoiseach of Ireland. There are no conclusive figures for the number of unofficial executions of captured Anti-Treaty fighters, but Republican officer Todd Andrews put the figure for "unauthorised killings" at 153.

In August 1923 W.T Cosgrave stated that all such unlawful killings would be investigated: "There was one matter I wished to refer to—first, the case of Mr. Noel Lemass, and secondly, the case of Mr. McEntee, who apparently was murdered during the last few days. I have to say that we condemn those acts unhesitatingly, and we wish to exhort all sections of the State to remember that there are means provided for dealing with any such cases, and it will be the duty of the Ministry to make every effort to bring to justice persons who contravene the law; that in securing life and property here we have to secure it for no one section more than another; and that the life and property of those who differ politically from us, or who may take extreme measures, will be dealt with according to law, and only according to law. Those acts have got no sanction, direct or indirect, or in any way, from us, and we will do our duty to every citizen regardless of what section he belongs to."

As well as the killings, up to 5,000 republican prisoners and internees started a hunger strike in September–November 1923, resulting in 7 deaths.

Effects
It has been argued that the Free State Government's policy of executions helped to end the Civil War. After the executions in reprisal for the killing of Seán Hales, there were no further attempts to assassinate members of parliament. On the other hand, there had been no previous attempts to assassinate TDs either, and the burning of senators' and TDs' homes continued after the executions. Another continuing argument is whether Anti-Treaty leaders believed that continuing the war would mean exposing their prisoners to further executions. This may have been a factor in Frank Aiken calling a halt to the Anti-Treaty campaign in April 1923.

There is no doubt that the executions and assassinations of the Civil War left a poisonous legacy of bitterness. The Free State's official executions of 77-81 Anti-Treaty prisoners during the Civil War was recalled by members of Fianna Fáil (the political party that emerged from the anti-Treaty side in 1926) with bitterness for a decade afterwards. In the Irish republican tradition, those IRA members executed in the Civil War became martyrs and were venerated in songs and poems. (For example, the ballad "Take It Down From The Mast", written in 1923 by James Ryan and later popularised by Dominic Behan).

As a result of the executions in the Civil War, many Republicans would never accept the Free State as a legitimate Irish government, but rather saw it as a repressive, British-imposed government. This attitude was partially alleviated after 1932, when Fianna Fáil, the party that represented the bulk of the Republican constituency, entered government peacefully. Ironically, in 1939 De Valera himself enacted the Offences against the State Act and the Emergency Powers Act 1939, under which a further 5 Republicans were executed by hanging.

Kevin O'Higgins, the man Republicans saw as most directly responsible for the enactment of the Public Safety Act, with its sanction of executions, himself fell victim to assassination by the IRA in 1927 - becoming one of the last victims of Civil War era violence in Ireland. Richard Mulcahy became a leader of Fine Gael in 1948, but never became Taoiseach because of his role in the Civil War.

In fiction
Author Ulick O'Connor wrote a play in 1985 titled Execution about the 1922 executions of Rory O'Connor, Liam Mellows, Joe McKelvey and Dick Barrett.

The 2006 film The Wind That Shakes the Barley climaxes with an IRA guerrilla being executed by a firing squad commanded by his own brother, who supports the Free State. This was inspired by the case of Sean and Tom Hales who were both leaders, but on opposing sides of the war.

The Republican: An Irish Civil War Story by T.S. O'Rourke follows the Irish Civil War from a Republican perspective in Dublin and includes details of the reprisal executions carried out by the Free State.

List of official executions

See also
 Timeline of the Irish Civil War
 Free State Intelligence Department – Oriel House
 Capital punishment in Ireland

References

Bibliography
 
  
 
  
  
  
  
 
  
 
  
 
  
  
 
 
 
 
 
 *

External links
 Republican perspective in an An Phoblacht article on the executions
 Irish writer Ulick O'Connor in the Irish Independent on the executions of December 8, 1922
 Article on the executions of seven republicans from Kildare
 New York Times, 9 December 1922 on the Executions of Mellows, O'Connor, McKelvey and Barrett
 Article on executions in Offaly
 An Phoblacht article about summary executions
 Republican article about killings in Dublin
 An article on the memory of the Civil War Killings in Dublin

Irish Civil War